Ville Tuppurainen (born 18 June 1988 in Laukaa) is a Finnish Nordic combined skier from Laukaa, Finland. His best result in the World Cup is a 39th place.

References

1988 births
Living people
People from Laukaa
Finnish male Nordic combined skiers
Sportspeople from Central Finland
21st-century Finnish people